Karl Kühn (9 March 1904 – 24 July 1986) was an Austrian cyclist. He competed in the individual and team road race events at the 1936 Summer Olympics.

References

External links
 

1904 births
1986 deaths
Austrian male cyclists
Olympic cyclists of Austria
Cyclists at the 1936 Summer Olympics
Place of birth missing
20th-century Austrian people